The 2017 Honda Indy 200 was an IndyCar Series event held on July 30, 2017, at the Mid-Ohio Sports Car Course in Lexington, Ohio. The race served as the 13th round of the 2017 IndyCar Series season. Australian Will Power started on pole position for the race, while his American teammate Josef Newgarden took victory.

Qualifying
Qualifying was held on Saturday, July 29. Will Power, for the third time at the track, qualified on pole, recording a time of 1:04.1720. Alongside him on the front row was his Team Penske teammate Josef Newgarden, while Takuma Sato qualified third. Rounding out the fast six qualifiers were Graham Rahal, Hélio Castroneves, and Scott Dixon. One incident occurred in qualifying when Tony Kanaan spun in turn two, bringing out yellow flags. As per IndyCar rules, Kanaan's fastest lap from the session was thrown out, relegating him to a 17th place start.

Race
The race was held on Sunday, July 30. The start of the race saw the top five qualifiers remain in grid order, while Simon Pagenaud managed to jump Scott Dixon in the first turn. Further back in the field, some drivers were able to make larger moves, such as Marco Andretti moving up from 14th to 10th. The opening laps were mostly uneventful aside from pit stops, as some, such as Carlos Muñoz and Max Chilton on lap 5. On lap 12, Alexander Rossi pitted having been the highest running driver using the softer option tires. He was followed the next lap by Ryan Hunter-Reay, Charlie Kimball, and James Hinchcliffe. At the same time as these pit stops, however, the battle for the lead suddenly heated up, with Josef Newgarden managing to pass Will Power on lap 13. Two laps later, third place exchanged hands, as Graham Rahal managed to make a pass on Takuma Sato. 

The leaders made their stops shortly after, reemerging in the same order. During the sequence, a minor incident occurred when Hunter-Reay spun while attempting to pass Sato and Hélio Castroneves after their pit stops. No caution was waved for this. This order remained intact through to the next round of pit stops, following which the running order was Newgarden, Power, Rahal, Rossi, Pagenaud. On lap 55, Pagenaud managed to move around Rossi to take over the fourth spot. This order remained until the last round of pit stops which began at lap 62. Newgarden remained out front by a healthy margin of over 12 seconds after the stops. 

On lap 67, Newgarden's gap was erased when the race's only caution period came due to Ed Jones spinning and stalling his car at turn 9. The restart came at the end of lap 70, with Newgarden's position protected by back marker Esteban Gutiérrez who had become wedged between Newgarden and Power. This allowed Newgarden to easily pull away and ensure his second consecutive victory and his third of the season. Behind him, Power managed to hold on to second place, despite heavy pressure from Graham Rahal in the closing laps. Fourth place when to Simon Pagenaud, while Takuma Sato managed to move back into the top five on the final restart to round out the top positions. All cars were listed as running at the end of the race. 

Newgarden's victory allowed him to jump to the top of the points standings with only four races remaining in the season, placing him ahead of his teammate Hélio Castroneves and Scott Dixon.

This race featured no DNFs.

Results

Qualifying

Source for individual rounds:

Race Results

Notes
 Points include 1 point for leading at least 1 lap during a race, an additional 2 points for leading the most race laps, and 1 point for Pole Position.

Source for time gaps:

Championship standings

Driver standings

Manufacturer standings

 Note: Only the top five positions are included.

References

Honda Indy 200
Honda Indy 200
Honda Indy 200
Indy 200 at Mid-Ohio